Radka Fišarová (born 19 December 1977) is a Czech singer. In 2002, she performed the title role in the famous Czech musical, Kleopatra, at Prague's Broadway Theatre. She performed the Czech language versions of the songs in the 2012 Disney film Brave soundtrack.

Discography

Studio albums
2003: Pod pařížským nebem
2008: Paris..Paris..
2011: Pocta Edith Piaf

References

External links

1977 births
Living people
Musicians from Prague
Actresses from Prague
21st-century Czech women singers